Hult International Business School (also known as Hult Business School or Hult) is a private business school with campuses in Cambridge, London, San Francisco, Dubai, New York City, and Shanghai. Hult is named for the school's benefactor Bertil Hult.

Hult offers undergraduate, master's, and MBA degree programs, as well as executive education through Ashridge Executive Education, housed on the Ashridge Estate campus.

Hult is the successor of the Arthur D. Little School of Management, founded in 1964 in Cambridge, Massachusetts, and of the Ashridge Business School, founded in 1959 in Ashridge, England.

The school is patron to the Hult Prize, a student entrepreneur competition.

History

American background
The Arthur D. Little School of Management was founded in 1964 by Arthur Dehon Little in Cambridge, Massachusetts. Originally developed as an executive management education program, the school began to grant degrees after receiving full accreditation by the New England Association of Schools and Colleges in 1976. In 1996, the Arthur D. Little School of Management formed a partnership with Boston College's Carroll School of Management in order to share access to faculty and facilities.

British background

In 1929, Ashridge was formally established as the College of Citizenship with the backing of the Conservative Party. In 1959, the college was re-established as a school of management under the name Ashridge Business School.

International era

In 2002, Swedish billionaire Bertil Hult purchased the Arthur D. Little School of Management, which resulted in the school's reorganization and reestablishment as Hult International Business School in 2003. Under its restructuring, Hult established a new curriculum oriented on international business, which led to the establishment of Hult's global campuses in Dubai (2008), San Francisco (2010), Shanghai (2011), and New York (2014).

In 2007, Hult acquired Huron University in London, a private American university located in London's Bloomsbury neighborhood, which subsequently was reestablished as Hult International Business School's London campus.

In 2014, Hult International Business School acquired and merged with Ashridge Business School, creating one of the largest business schools in the world. After 2015, the two schools began operating as a singular entity, with the establishment of Ashridge Executive Education as Hult's executive program.

Hult opened its undergraduate campus in London, near the City of London financial centre, in 2014.

The Economist Intelligence Unit, supported by Hult International Business School, launched the Business Professor of the Year Award in 2012.

Campuses

Hult maintains 7 campuses across 6 countries and serves approximately 3,000 students: two undergraduate and postgraduate campuses (London and Boston), three postgraduate campuses that serve as summer rotational campuses (San Francisco, Shanghai and Dubai) one solely postgraduate campuses (New York City), and one executive education campus (Ashridge Estate in Hertfordshire, United Kingdom). Students are encouraged to rotate between campuses during their programs.

The Hult London Undergraduate Campus, built by British firm Sergison Bates Architects, won the Royal Institute of British Architects National Award in 2015.

Academics

Hult conducts business and market research out of its global research centers.

Hult International Business School has an acceptance rate of 28%. It has over 19,000 alumni in over 156 countries.

The Carnegie Classification of Institutions of Higher Education classifies Hult as a More Selective Institution.

Rankings
Hult's Master of International Business program was ranked #17 in The Economist's ranking of Masters in Management programs worldwide in 2019.

In 2020, Hult's Ashridge Executive Education was ranked #16 in the Financial Times Executive Education Top 50 Schools list.

In 2022, Hult's Executive MBA was ranked among the top 100 in the world in the QS International Trade Rankings.

EY Tech MBA by Hult
On 1 July 2020, Hult and Ernst & Young (EY) announced the EY Tech MBA by Hult, consisting of online learning, practical experiences, insight papers and a capstone project. This MBA is now offered by EY free to all its people, regardless of rank or location and can be done over any duration. The curriculum is updated every four months.

Hult Prize

Hult International Business School is the lead sponsor of the Hult Prize (formerly Hult Global Case Challenge), an annual international case competition launched in 2010 that asks students to find solutions to global social challenges. The Prize is a partnership between Hult International Business School, the Clinton Global Initiative, and the United Nations Foundation.

The best teams from each regional event advance to a global final, at which a single winning team is chosen. Bertil Hult provides a $1 million cash grant to help fund the winning solution.

Notable alumni 

Thabo Mbeki, 2nd President of South Africa
Htin Kyaw, 9th President of Myanmar
Luis Abinader, current President of the Dominican Republic
Gary Smith, CEO of Ciena
André Bier Gerdau Johannpeter, CEO of Gerdau
Hixonia Nyasulu, Chairwoman of Sasol
Oba Otudeko, Founder of Honeywell Group and Forbes Africa's 40 Richest
Walter Bayly Llona, CEO of Credicorp
Shaun Gregory, CEO of Exterion Media
Nataliey Bitature, 2016 World Economic Forum's Top 5 African Innovators & 2014 Forbes 30 Under 30
Anil Shastri, Indian parliamentarian; son of former Prime Minister Lal Bahadur Shastri
Mbaranga Gasarabwe, United Nations Assistant Secretary-General for Safety and Security
Juan Cohen, parliamentarian in the Central American Parliament
Tonika Sealy-Thompson, Barbados' Ambassador to Brazil

See also
 Hult Prize
 EF Education First
 Bertil Hult

References

External links

 
 

 
Educational institutions established in 1964
Business schools in California
Business schools in England
Business schools in Massachusetts
Business schools in China
Business schools in the United Arab Emirates
Private universities and colleges in Massachusetts
Private universities and colleges in California
Private universities and colleges in New York (state)
1964 establishments in Massachusetts